Pauls Putniņš (12 November 1937 – 1 December 2018) was a Latvian playwright, journalist and politician.

Biography 
He graduated from the Latvian State Conservatory in 1963, after which he worked as an assistant director and director at the Dailes and Liepāja Theatres. A dramatist from 1965, he was one of the most popular Latvian playwrights in the 1970s and 1980s, writing over 30 plays; some 25 of his works were staged in professional and amateur theatres across Latvia. Putniņš is a member of the Latvian Writers' Union and a member of the Union of Theatre Workers, and became a Playwrights Guild member in 1999. 

In the Latvian independence period he became involved in politics. He was elected the fifth and sixth Parliamentary deputy from the Latvian Farmers' Union, and was then elected to the Riga City Council. In 2010 he was announced that would not stand for the 10th Parliamentary elections and would leave politics.

References

1937 births
2018 deaths
People from Cēsis Municipality
Latvian Farmers' Union politicians
Deputies of the 5th Saeima
Deputies of the 6th Saeima
Deputies of the 9th Saeima
Latvian dramatists and playwrights